The 1996 Bausch & Lomb Championships was a women's tennis tournament played on outdoor clay courts at the Amelia Island Plantation on Amelia Island, Florida in the United States that was part of Tier II of the 1996 WTA Tour. It was the 17th edition of the tournament and was held from April 8 through April 14, 1996. Eighth-seeded Irina Spîrlea won the singles title.

Finals

Singles

 Irina Spîrlea defeated  Mary Pierce 6–7, 6–4, 6–3
 It was Spîrlea's 1st title of the year and the 5th of her career.

Doubles

 Chanda Rubin /  Arantxa Sánchez Vicario defeated  Meredith McGrath /  Larisa Savchenko 6–1, 6–1
 It was Rubin's 4th title of the year and the 7th of her career. It was Sánchez Vicario's 5th title of the year and the 67th of her career.

References

External links
 ITF tournament edition details

Bausch and Lomb Championships
Amelia Island Championships
Bausch and Lomb Championships
Bausch and Lomb Championships
Bausch and Lomb Championships